This list of tunnels in Norway includes any road, rail or waterway tunnel in Norway.

There are over 900 road tunnels in Norway with total length exceeding 750 km. 

The longest road tunnels (>7 km, with opening year and length):

The longest subsea road tunnels (see also List of subsea tunnels in Norway):

The longest railway tunnels:

See also
List of subsea tunnels in Norway 
List of tunnels by location

Norway
Tunnels
 
Tunnels